Organitis is a genus of moth in the family Gelechiidae.

Species
 Organitis characopa Meyrick, 1906
 Organitis lubrica (Meyrick, 1910)

References

Gelechiinae